Shahbaz Butt (born 14 April 1980) is a Pakistani first-class cricketer who played for Lahore cricket team.

References

External links
 

1980 births
Living people
Pakistani cricketers
Lahore cricketers
Cricketers from Lahore